Ferenc Szilágyi (born 13 December 1952) is a Hungarian sports shooter. He competed in the mixed 50 metre rifle prone event at the 1980 Summer Olympics.

References

External links
 

1952 births
Living people
Hungarian male sport shooters
Olympic shooters of Hungary
Shooters at the 1980 Summer Olympics
People from Pásztó
Sportspeople from Nógrád County